Testerian is a pictorial writing system that was used until the 19th century to teach Christian doctrine to the indigenous peoples of Mexico, who were unfamiliar with alphabetic writing systems. Its invention is attributed to Jacobo de Testera, a Franciscan who arrived in Mexico in 1529.

Bibliography

Catecismo pictórico Otomí

Auxiliary and educational artificial scripts
Writing systems of the Americas